Krsno ime is a South Slavic term that can refer to:

 Krsna slava, a ceremony commemorating family patron saints, primarily among Serbian Orthodox Christians
 Christian name or baptismal name, among all Christians

References

Croatian words and phrases
Serbian words and phrases